= LTC TV =

TV channel

- Country: Egypt

Programming
- Language: Arabic
- Picture format: SDTV 576i

Ownership
- Owner: Samira El deghedy

History
- Launched: 2020

LTC TV Channel is an Egyptian TV channel based in Giza, Egypt. It covers current events, as well as broadcasting content concerning political and religious topics, and some entertainment programmes. The channel has a particular focus on Egyptian topics. Its main owner is Samira El deghedy.
